Colm Gildernew MLA (born 27 June 1969) is a Sinn Féin politician from Dungannon, Northern Ireland who has served as Member of the Legislative Assembly for the Fermanagh and South Tyrone constituency in the Northern Ireland Assembly since June 2017.

References

External links

1969 births
Living people
Northern Ireland MLAs 2017–2022
Sinn Féin MLAs
People from Dungannon
Politicians from County Tyrone
Northern Ireland MLAs 2022–2027